Donitriptan (INN) (code name F-11356) is a triptan drug which was investigated as an antimigraine agent but ultimately was never marketed. It acts as a high-affinity, high-efficacy/near-full agonist of the 5-HT1B (pKi = 9.4–10.1; IA = 94%) and 5-HT1D receptors (pKi = 9.3–10.2; IA = 97%), and is among the most potent of the triptan series of drugs. Donitriptan was being developed in France by bioMérieux-Pierre Fabre and made it to phase II clinical trials in Europe before development was discontinued.

References

5-HT1B agonists
5-HT1D agonists
Antimigraine drugs
Indole ethers at the benzene ring
Aromatic nitriles
Phenylpiperazines
Triptans
Abandoned drugs